Yaohua may refer to:

Places  
Yaohua Road (Shanghai Metro), an interchange system between Line 7 and Line 8 of the Shanghai Metro
Yaohua High School, a high school located in Tianjin, China
Yaohua Experimental School, an independent college preparatory school located in Shenzhen

People 
Xiong Yaohua (1937–1985), birth name of Gu Long, Taiwanese novelist
Lin Yaohua (1910–2000), Chinese sociologist and anthropologist

Other uses 
MV Yaohua, the original name of a 1967 built passenger ship that now serves a floating tourist attraction in Tianjin, China